In machine learning, reinforcement learning from human feedback (RLHF) or reinforcement learning from human preferences  is a technique that trains a "reward model" directly from human feedback and uses it as a reward function to optimize an agent's policy using  reinforcement learning (RL). RLHF can improve the robustness and exploration of RL agents, especially when the reward function is sparse or noisy.

The human feedback is collected by asking humans to rank instances of the agent's behavior. These rankings can then be used to score outputs, for example, using the Elo rating system.

RLHF has been applied to various domains of natural language processing, such as conversational agents, text summarization, and natural language understanding. Regular reinforcement learning, where agents learn from their own actions based on a "reward function", is difficult to apply to natural language processing tasks because the rewards are often not easy to define or measure, especially when dealing with complex tasks that involve human values or preferences. RLHF can enable language models to provide answers that align with these complex values, generate more verbose responses, and reject questions that are either inappropriate or outside the knowledge space of the model. Some examples of RLHF-trained language models are OpenAI's ChatGPT and its predecessor InstructGPT, as well as DeepMind's Sparrow.

RLHF has also been applied to other areas such as the development of video game bots. For example, OpenAI and DeepMind trained agents to play Atari games based on human preferences. The agents achieved strong performance in many of the environments tested, often surpassing human performance.

Challenges and limitations

One major challenge of RLHF is the scalability and cost of human feedback, which can be slow and expensive compared to unsupervised learning. The quality and consistency of human feedback can also vary depending on the task, the interface, and the individual preferences of the humans. Even when human feedback is feasible, RLHF models may still exhibit undesirable behaviors that are not captured by human feedback or exploit loopholes in the reward model, which brings into light the challenges of alignment and robustness.

See also
 Reinforcement learning
 ChatGPT

References

Machine learning
Reinforcement learning
Language modeling
Artificial intelligence